Rosalie Garcia (born c. 1953), also known as Shorty, is a former drug dealer. She headed a deadly heroin ring in the Bronx in New York City in the 1990s. Garcia made $70,000 per week as part of the Hoe Avenue Crew. 
She was showcased on the TV show Gangsters: America's Most Evil in the episode "Lethal Beauties: Beltran, Henao and Garcia". Garcia was convicted in the 2005 trial United States v. Rosalie Garcia, Manuel Roman, and Ricardo Silva, and she and her son Manuel Roman were sentenced to life in prison.

References

Living people
Year of birth missing (living people)
Place of birth missing (living people)
Criminals from New York City
20th-century American criminals
American female murderers
American people convicted of murder
Drug dealers
American people convicted of drug offenses